Francesco Bonifaccio was an Italian painter of the Baroque period. He was born at Viterbo in 1637, and was a pupil of Pietro da Cortona at the time that Ciro Ferri and Romanelli studied under that master.

References

1637 births
17th-century Italian painters
Italian male painters
Italian Baroque painters
People from Viterbo
Year of death missing